Thomas McLellan McMillan (12 February 1919 – 30 April 1980) was a Scottish Labour politician.

McMillan was a wood machinist at Cowlairs railway workshops. He was a councillor on Glasgow City Council from 1962 and of the city's Housing and Health Licensing Court.

McMillan was member of parliament for Glasgow Central from 1966 until 1980, when he died at a hospital in London due to injuries sustained falling from a bus two weeks prior. The resulting by-election was won by Bob McTaggart, who himself also died in office in 1989.

References 

Times Guide to the House of Commons, 1966 & 1979

External links 

1919 births
1980 deaths
Councillors in Glasgow
Road incident deaths in London
Scottish Labour councillors
Scottish Labour MPs
Machinists
Members of the Parliament of the United Kingdom for Scottish constituencies
Members of the Parliament of the United Kingdom for Glasgow constituencies
National Union of Railwaymen-sponsored MPs
UK MPs 1966–1970
UK MPs 1970–1974
UK MPs 1974
UK MPs 1974–1979
UK MPs 1979–1983